Marcel Journet (25 July 1868 – 7 September 1933), was a French, bass, operatic singer. He enjoyed a prominent career in England, France and Italy, and appeared at the foremost American opera houses in New York City and Chicago.

Biography
Journet was born in the town of Grasse, Alpes-Maritimes, and studied at the Paris Conservatory. He made his operatic debut at Montpellier in 1891. Journet went on to sing a wide range of roles in operas by Richard Wagner and major French and Italian composers during a distinguished, 40-year career.

The Royal Opera House at London's Covent Garden, Milan's La Scala, the Paris Opera and the New York Metropolitan Opera, were some of the famous venues graced by Journet's presence during the first quarter of the 20th century. Arturo Toscanini was just one of the celebrated conductors under whose baton he performed. His on-stage colleagues included such renowned singers as Nellie Melba, Luisa Tetrazzini, Enrico Caruso, Giovanni Martinelli, Titta Ruffo, Giuseppe De Luca and Feodor Chaliapin.

Journet died in Vittel, of kidney failure, aged 66.

He possessed a beautiful, cultured voice and a fine technique—hitting the absolute peak of his powers as a singer and an actor during the 1915-1925 period, during which time he became La Scala's principal bass.

Numerous recordings testify to Journet's outstanding vocal attributes and the high standard of his interpretative powers. Many of these recordings have been re-issued on various CDs, most notably on the Marston and Preiser labels.

References
 Warrack, John and Rosenthal, Harold, The Concise Oxford Dictionary of Opera, London, second edition, 1980.
 Scott, Michael, The Record of Singing, Volume II, Duckworth, London, 1979.
Jean-Pierre Mouchon, "Marcel Journet" in "Étude", n° 6, 1997 (Association internationale de chant lyrique TITTA RUFFO, site: titta-ruffo-international.jimdo.com).
Jean-Pierre Mouchon, "Marcel Journet" in "The Record Collector", volume 47, n°1, March 2002.
 Jean-Pierre Mouchon: "Une basse française d'exception: Marcel Journet, two volumes, Édilivre, Saint-Denis, France, vol. I (Life, career, discography, and index), 314 pages, ill, 2015. ISBN paper: 978-2-332-89248-5, ISBN pdf: 978-2-332-89249-2, ISBN epub: 978-2-332-89247. Vol. II (chronology, index, bibliography), 445 pages, ill. 2015. ISBN paper: 978-2-332-89251-5, ISBN pdf: 978-2-332-89252-2, ISBN epub: 978-2-332-89250-8

External links
 Marcel Journet recordings at the Discography of American Historical Recordings.

1867 births
1933 deaths
People from Grasse
French basses
19th-century French male opera singers
Operatic bass-baritones
Victor Records artists
20th-century French male opera singers